The atoll of Manua'e, also known as Scilly, is located approximately  to the northwest of Maupiha'a ( Mopelia) and  to the west of Maupiti. It is the westernmost of the Society Islands' Leeward Islands, located 217 mi. (350 km) west of Bora Bora and 342 mi. (550 km) west of Pape'ete.

Geography
Manua'e consists of a ring of islands approximately 6–7 mi. in diameter, separated by unnavigable passages, rising just a few feet above sea level.

Administration
The atoll is administratively part of the commune (municipality) of Maupiti, itself in the administrative subdivision of the Leeward Islands.

Nature reserve
The atoll's lagoon, home to a number of rare species, has been a nature reserve since 1992. The beaches are popular with sea turtles, including the endangered green sea turtle, which come annually to lie on Manua'e's beaches beginning each November. The atoll is also home to large oyster beds, containing up to 3 or 4 million oysters.

History
Manua'e's first European visitor was British navigator Samuel Wallis, in 1767. A small village was established there at the time, the remains of which can still be found on the northern part of the main island. The atoll was the site of the 1855 shipwreck of the three-masted Julia Ann. Its crew and passengers, including twenty-four women and children, lived on the atoll for two months, during which time they were able to build a boat with which they were able to sail to Ra'iātea. There is no evidence that the islands were ever permanently inhabited prior to the shipwreck of the Julia Ann, a ship whose passengers were mainly Latter-day Saints on their way from Australia to the United States. Beginning in 1952, the islands were regularly visited by copra merchants. During the 1960s, these casual visitors began capturing large numbers of sea turtles until their activities were legally restricted in 1971. Today the atoll is visited regularly by fishermen from Ra'iātea.

The islands, which have no regular ship or airline connections with other locations in French Polynesia, are owned by the "Compagnie Française de Tahiti", which cultivated 57,000 coconut palms there in the 1920s. The now-abandoned plantation once produced up to 70 tons of copra annually.

On June 25, 2005, the Silverwood family of California crashed into the reef in a 55-foot catamaran, the Emerald Jane. Thanks to an EPIRB distress call, the family was spotted by a French Navy airplane, picked up by the resident Taputo family, and flown out in a helicopter on June 26 the next day. John Silverwood, the captain of the Emerald Jane, would lose his leg, and the experience is described in the book Black Wave. After the incident, he had an organization, GodSwell, which takes people with disabilities and life-threatening illnesses out at sea. It was also featured in an episode of I Shouldn't Be Alive and I Survived...

Other names

See also

 Maupiti (commune)
 Desert island
 List of islands

External links
Manua'e at partenaire-info.net (accessed Oct. 22, 2006)
Lesser known Society Islands at colonialvoyage.com
Classification of the French Polynesian atolls by Salvat (1985)

Atolls of the Society Islands
Uninhabited islands of French Polynesia